Bye Bye may refer to:

Music

Albums
 Bye Bye (album), by Annalisa, 2018
 Bye Bye, by Trio, 1983

Songs
 "Bye Bye" (Ai Otsuka song), 2009
 "Bye Bye" (Beni song), 2010
 "Bye, Bye" (Elena Risteska song), 2008
 "Bye, Bye" (Jo Dee Messina song), 1998
 "Bye Bye" (Mariah Carey song), 2008
 "Bye Bye" (Marshmello and Juice Wrld song), 2022
 "Bye Bye" (Miliyah Kato song), 2010
 "Bye Bye." (Nanase Aikawa song), 1996
 "Bye Bye", by Alejandra Guzmán from Indeleble, 2006
 "Bye Bye", by Belanova from Fantasía Pop, 2007
 "Bye Bye", by Capital Bra from CB6, 2019
 "Bye Bye", by David Civera, 2002
 "Bye Bye", by Future from Purple Reign, 2016
 "Bye Bye", by Gryffin from Gravity, 2019
 "Bye Bye", by Marcy Playground, 1999
 "Bye Bye", by Mozart La Para, 2017
 "Bye Bye", by Safia from Internal, 2016

Other media
 Bye-Bye (film), a 1995 French drama
 Bye Bye (TV series), a Québécois New Year's Eve sketch-comedy special
 Bye-Bye (novel), a 1997 novel by Jane Ransom

See also
 "Bye Bye Bye", a song by NSYNC
 "Bye Bye Bye!", a song by C-ute
 "Bye, Bye, Bye", a song by Jellyfish from Spilt Milk